Algimantas Norvilas (born 4 November 1953 in Siauliai) is a Lithuanian politician.  In 1990 he was among those who signed the Act of the Re-Establishment of the State of Lithuania.

References

External links
 Biography

1953 births
Living people
Lithuanian politicians
People from Šiauliai